The Yana-Oymyakon Highlands, also known as  Oymyakon Highlands, are a mountainous area in the Sakha Republic, Khabarovsk Krai and Magadan Oblast, Far Eastern Federal District, Russia.
The area is named after the main features of the highlands. 

Kigilyakhs are found in some places of the plateaus. These are rock formations that are valued in Yakut culture.

Geography  
The Yana-Oymyakon Highlands are a mountain region of the East Siberian System located between the southern reaches of the Verkhoyansk Range to the west, the Suntar-Khayata Range to the southwest and the Chersky mountain range to the northeast. The main highland features are the vast Yana Plateau in the northwest, the Elgi Plateau in the middle and the Oymyakon Plateau in the southeast. The highlands include the Kuydusun and Agalkin intermontane basins, as well as mountain chains of moderate altitude, such as the Nelgesin and Tirekhtyakh ranges. 

The whole zone is characterized by harsh, cold winters and is very sparsely populated. The main towns are Oymyakon and Verkhoyansk, the latter close to the northwestern end of the highland area.

Hydrography
The upper course of the Yana River flows through the northwestern part of the Yana-Oymyakon Highlands with its following tributaries: Bytantay, Dulgalakh, Sartang, Adycha, Borulakh, Nelgese, Derbeke and Charky, among others. The Delinya River, a right tributary of the Tompo —part of the Lena basin, flows from the central part of the highlands, and the Indigirka River flows in the southeastern part with its tributaries Tuora-Yuryakh, Kuydusun, Kyuente, Elgi, and other minor ones.

Flora
Forests of larch taiga generally cover the lower slopes of the mountain ranges and there are steppe areas in some places on the southern slopes. The mountaintops are covered with mountain tundra. Willows and poplars may grow in the floodplains of the intermontane basins.

References

External links
Physiogeography of the Russian Far East

Mountain ranges of Magadan Oblast
Mountain ranges of the Sakha Republic
Geography of Khabarovsk Krai
East Siberian Mountains
ru:Яно-Оймяконское нагорье
sah:Дьааҥы хаптал хайалара